Sobrr is a mobile application for iOS and Android. It was released in July 2014. It has been described by critics as an "anti-Facebook" social media.

See also
 Snapchat

References

External links
 

IOS software
Android (operating system) software
2014 software